The River Plantation Invitational was a golf tournament on the LPGA Tour from 1968 to 1969. It was played at the River Plantation Country Club in Conroe, Texas. Kathy Whitworth won both editions of the event.

Winners
River Plantation Women's Open
1969 Kathy Whitworth

River Plantation Invitational
1968 Kathy Whitworth

References

Former LPGA Tour events
Golf in Texas
Conroe, Texas
1968 establishments in Texas
1969 disestablishments in Texas
History of women in Texas